The 2016–17 Denver Nuggets season was the 41st season of the franchise in the National Basketball Association (NBA). Thanks to the continuing improvements of Nikola Jokić, the Nuggets would make significant improvements to their team, although they would be just one game shy from reaching the NBA playoffs that year.

Key dates
 June 23, 2016: The 2016 NBA Draft takes place at the Barclays Center in Brooklyn, New York.
 September 9, 2016: Chuck Hayes retires as a player to become a player development coach and hold a front office role for the team somewhere at an entry-level position.
 October 29, 2016: The Denver Nuggets officially retire Dikembe Mutombo's number.
 February 13, 2017: Denver traded center Jusuf Nurkić and the Memphis Grizzlies' own 2017 first round pick to the Portland Trail Blazers in exchange for center Mason Plumlee, a 2018 second round pick, and cash considerations.

Draft

Roster

Standings

Division

Conference

Game log

Pre-season

|- style="background:#bfb;;"
| 1
| October 3
| @ Raptors
| 
| Jusuf Nurkić (15)
| Jusuf Nurkić (10)
| Will Barton (5)
| Scotiabank Saddledome19,600
| 1–0
|- style="background:#bfb;"
| 2
| October 7
| @ Lakers
| 
| Will Barton (20)
| Jusuf Nurkić (14)
| Mudiay, Murray (6)
| Staples Center16,461
| 2–0
|- style="background:#fbb;"
| 3
| October 9
| @ Lakers
| 
| Jusuf Nurkić (21)
| Jusuf Nurkić (16)
| Emmanuel Mudiay (7)
| Citizens Business Bank Arena8,389
| 2–1
|- style="background:#fbb;"
| 4
| October 12
| @ Timberwolves
| 
| Wilson Chandler (16)
| Faried, Toupane (7)
| Kennedy, Toupane (3)
| Pinnacle Bank Arena7,153
| 2–2
|- style="background:#fbb;"
| 5
| October 14
| Warriors
| 
| Danilo Gallinari (19)
| Nikola Jokić (10)
| Jamal Murray (7)
| Pepsi Center10,104
| 2–3
|- style="background:#bfb;"
| 6
| October 16
| @ Trail Blazers
| 
| Wilson Chandler (18)
| Jusuf Nurkić (9)
| Will Barton (7)
| Moda Center18,135
| 3–3
|- style="background:#fbb;"
| 7
| October 18
| @ Thunder
| 
| Danilo Gallinari (18)
| Jusuf Nurkić (13)
| Will Barton (4)
| Chesapeake Energy ArenaN/A
| 3–4
|- style="background:#bfb;"
| 8
| October 21
| Mavericks
| 
| Danilo Gallinari (16)
| Kenneth Faried (9)
| Jokić, Nelson (4)
| Pepsi Center8,453
| 4–4

Regular season

|- bgcolor=#bfb
| 1
| October 26
| @ New Orleans
| 
| Jusuf Nurkić (23)
| Jusuf Nurkić (9)
| Nurkić, Mudiay, Nelson (3)
| Smoothie King Center15,869
| 1–0
|- bgcolor=#fbb
| 2
| October 29
| Portland
| 
| Nikola Jokić (23)
| Nikola Jokić (17)
| Emmanuel Mudiay (4)
| Pepsi Center18,055
| 1–1
|- bgcolor=#fbb
| 3
| October 31
| @ Toronto
| 
| Mudiay, Barton, Gallinari (16)
| Jusuf Nurkić (9)
| Emmanuel Mudiay (4)
| Air Canada Centre19,800
| 1–2

|- bgcolor=#bfb
| 4
| November 3
| @ Minnesota
| 
| Wilson Chandler (19)
| Jameer Nelson (7)
| Jameer Nelson (7)
| Target Center11,219
| 2–2
|- bgcolor=#fbb
| 5
| November 5
| @ Detroit
| 
| Wilson Chandler (21)
| Jusuf Nurkić (12)
| Jameer Nelson (4)
| The Palace of Auburn Hills16,218
| 2–3
|- bgcolor=#bfb
| 6
| November 6
| @ Boston
| 
| Emmanuel Mudiay (30)
| Kenneth Faried (11)
| Jameer Nelson (7)
| TD Garden17,452
| 3–3
|- bgcolor=#fbb
| 7
| November 8
| @ Memphis
| 
| Emmanuel Mudiay (23)
| Kenneth Faried (11)
| Emmanuel Mudiay (7)
| FedExForum15,109
| 3–4
|- bgcolor=#fbb
| 8
| November 10
| Golden State
| 
| Jamal Murray (14)
| Kenneth Faried (11)
| Jamal Murray (6)
| Pepsi Center17,569
| 3–5
|- bgcolor=#fbb
| 9
| November 12
| Detroit
| 
| Emmanuel Mudiay (19)
| Wilson Chandler (10)
| Gary Harris (4)
| Pepsi Center13,997
| 3–6
|- bgcolor=#fbb
| 10
| November 13
| @ Portland
| 
| Danilo Gallinari (19)
| Kenneth Faried (14)
| Nikola Jokić (3)
| Moda Center19,362
| 3–7
|- bgcolor=#bfb
| 11
| November 16
| Phoenix
| 
| Wilson Chandler (28)
| Kenneth Faried (15)
| Emmanuel Mudiay (6)
| Pepsi Center10,247
| 4–7
|- bgcolor=#fbb
| 12
| November 18
| Toronto
| 
| Emmanuel Mudiay (25)
| Nikola Jokić (12)
| Emmanuel Mudiay (9)
| Pepsi Center12,476
| 4–8
|- bgcolor=#bfb
| 13
| November 20
| Utah
| 
| Wilson Chandler (17)
| Jusuf Nurkić (11)
| Mudiay, Gallinari (8)
| Pepsi Center12,565
| 5–8
|- bgcolor=#bfb
| 14
| November 22
| Chicago
| 
| Jamal Murray (24)
| Jusuf Nurkić (14)
| Jameer Nelson (7)
| Pepsi Center14,328
| 6–8
|- bgcolor=#fbb
| 15
| November 23
| @ Utah
| 
| Jamal Murray (23)
| Kenneth Faried (10)
| Jusuf Nurkić (6)
| Vivint Smart Home Arena19,229
| 6–9
|- bgcolor=#fbb
| 16
| November 25
| Oklahoma City
| 
| Jameer Nelson (21)
| Wilson Chandler (11)
| Jameer Nelson (13)
| Pepsi Center 14,327
| 6–10
|- bgcolor=#bfb
| 17
| November 27
| @ Phoenix
| 
| Wilson Chandler (25)
| Nikola Jokić (11)
| Emmanuel Mudiay (6)
| Talking Stick Resort Arena15,365
| 7–10
|- bgcolor=#fbb
| 18
| November 30
| Miami
| 
| Nelson, Gallinari, Jokić, Chandler (17)
| Nikola Jokić (14)
| Jameer Nelson (8)
| Pepsi Center11,471
| 7–11

|- bgcolor=#fbb
| 19
| December 2
| Houston
| 
| Wilson Chandler (24)
| Kenneth Faried (10)
| Emmanuel Mudiay (6)
| Pepsi Center15,549
| 7–12
|- bgcolor=#fbb
| 20
| December 3
| @ Utah
| 
| Barton, Chandler (20)
| Kenneth Faried (6)
| Jameer Nelson (7)
| Vivint Smart Home Arena19,911
| 7–13
|- bgcolor=#bfb
| 21
| December 5
| @ Philadelphia
| 
| Danilo Gallinari (24)
| Jusuf Nurkić (10)
| Jameer Nelson (4)
| Wells Fargo Center11,815
| 8–13
|- bgcolor=#fbb
| 22
| December 7
| @ Brooklyn
| 
| Wilson Chandler (27)
| Wilson Chandler (15)
| Jameer Nelson (5)
| Barclays Center14,159
| 8–14
|- bgcolor=#fbb
| 23
| December 8
| @ Washington
| 
| Nikola Jokić (17)
| Nikola Jokić (11)
| Jameer Nelson (5)
| Verizon Center12,645
| 8–15
|- bgcolor=#bfb
| 24
| December 10
| @ Orlando
| 
| Danilo Gallinari (21)
| Kenneth Faried (10)
| Nikola Jokić (6)
| Amway Center17,010
| 9–15
|- bgcolor=#fbb
| 25
| December 12
| @ Dallas
| 
| Nikola Jokić (27)
| Nikola Jokić (11)
| Jokić, Mudiay (4)
| American Airlines Center19,425
| 9–16
|- bgcolor=#bfb
| 26
| December 15
| Portland
| 
| Danilo Gallinari (27)
| Kenneth Faried (9)
| Gary Harris (6)
| Pepsi Center10,022
| 10–16
|- bgcolor=#bfb
| 27
| December 17
| New York
| 
| Kenneth Faried (25)
| Nikola Jokić (9)
| Jokić, Mudiay (5)
| Pepsi Center12,042
| 11–16
|- bgcolor=#bfb
| 28
| December 19
| Dallas
| 
| Nikola Jokić (27)
| Nikola Jokić (15)
| Nikola Jokić (9)
| Pepsi Center12,581
| 12–16
|- bgcolor=#fbb
| 29
| December 20
| @ L.A. Clippers
| 
| Gary Harris (22)
| Kenneth Faried (11)
| Jameer Nelson (6)
| Staples Center19,060
| 12–17
|- bgcolor=#fbb
| 30
| December 23
| Atlanta
| 
| Danilo Gallinari (21)
| Chandler, Gallinari (11)
| Nikola Jokić (6)
| Pepsi Center13,823
| 12–18
|- bgcolor=#bfb
| 31
| December 26
| @ L.A. Clippers
| 
| Nikola Jokić (24)
| Danilo Gallinari (11)
| Jameer Nelson (6)
| Staples Center19,060
| 13–18
|- bgcolor=#bfb
| 32
| December 28
| Minnesota
| 
| Danilo Gallinari (18)
| Nikola Jokić (8)
| Nikola Jokić (11)
| Pepsi Center15,093
| 14–18
|- bgcolor=#fbb
| 33
| December 30
| Philadelphia
| 
| Nikola Jokić (25)
| Wilson Chandler (9)
| Nelson, Mudiay (5)
| Pepsi Center13,619
| 14–19

|- bgcolor=#fbb
| 34
| January 2
| @ Golden State
| 
| Jokić, Chandler (21)
| Nikola Jokić (13)
| Nikola Jokić (5)
| Oracle Arena19,596
| 14–20
|- bgcolor=#fbb
| 35
| January 3
| Sacramento
| 
| Danilo Gallinari (24)
| Nikola Jokić (7)
| Emmanuel Mudiay (6)
| Pepsi Center11, 018
| 14–21
|- bgcolor=#fbb
| 36
| January 5
| San Antonio
| 
| Nikola Jokić (19)
| Nikola Jokić (11)
| Harris, Jokić, Mudiay (5)
| Pepsi Center14,391
| 14–22
|- bgcolor=#fbb
| 37
| January 7
| @ Oklahoma City
| 
| Will Barton (21)
| Nurkić, Faried (10)
| Jameer Nelson (8)
| Chesapeake Energy Arena18,203
| 14–23
|- bgcolor=#bfb
| 38
| January 12
| Indiana
| 
| Nikola Jokić (22)
| Nikola Jokić (10)
| Jokić, Mudiay (7)
| The O2 Arena16,468
| 15–23
|- bgcolor=#bfb
| 39
| January 16
| Orlando
| 
| Nikola Jokić (30)
| Nikola Jokić (11)
| Emmanuel Mudiay (13)
| Pepsi Center11,217
| 16–23
|- bgcolor=#bfb
| 40
| January 17
| @ L.A. Lakers
| 
| Nikola Jokić (29)
| Nikola Jokić (15)
| Will Barton (8)
| Staples Center18,412
| 17–23
|- bgcolor=#fbb
| 41
| January 19
| @ San Antonio
| 
| Nikola Jokić (35)
| Nikola Jokić (12)
| Jameer Nelson (9)
| AT&T Center18,418
| 17–24
|- bgcolor=#bfb
| 42
| January 21
| L.A. Clippers
| 
| Nikola Jokić (19)
| Nikola Jokić (10)
| Jameer Nelson (8)
| Pepsi Center16,056
| 18–24
|- bgcolor=#fbb
| 43
| January 22
| @ Minnesota
| 
| Gary Harris (22)
| Nikola Jokić (8)
| Will Barton (6)
| Target Center12,788
| 18–25
|- bgcolor=#bfb
| 44
| January 24
| Utah
| 
| Nikola Jokić (23)
| Nikola Jokić (11)
| Jameer Nelson (7)
| Pepsi Center10,867
| 19–25
|- bgcolor=#bfb
| 45
| January 26
| Phoenix
| 
| Nikola Jokić (29)
| Nikola Jokić (14)
| Jameer Nelson (9)
| Pepsi Center12,231
| 20–25
|- bgcolor=#bfb
| 46
| January 28
| @ Phoenix
| 
| Danilo Gallinari (32)
| Kenneth Faried (13)
| Jameer Nelson (6)
| Talking Stick Resort Arena18,055
| 21–25
|- bgcolor=#fbb
| 47
| January 31
| @ L.A. Lakers
| 
| Wilson Chandler (26)
| Kenneth Faried (17)
| Jameer Nelson (7)
| Staples Center18,997
| 21–26

|- bgcolor=#fbb
| 48
| February 1
| Memphis
| 
| Arthur, Mudiay, Gallinari (14)
| Kenneth Faried (11)
| Emmanuel Mudiay (7)
| Pepsi Center12,020
| 21–27
|- bgcolor=#bfb
| 49
| February 3
| Milwaukee
| 
| Wilson Chandler (23)
| Nikola Jokić (13)
| Nikola Jokić (11)
| Pepsi Center18,792
| 22–27
|- bgcolor=#fbb
| 50
| February 4
| @ San Antonio
| 
| Jamal Murray (20)
| Jusuf Nurkić (8)
| Will Barton (5)
| AT&T Center18,418
| 22–28
|- bgcolor=#bfb
| 51
| February 6
| Dallas
| 
| Will Barton (31)
| Wilson Chandler (10)
| Nikola Jokić (9)
| Pepsi Center13,047
| 23–28
|- bgcolor=#fbb
| 52
| February 8
| @ Atlanta
| 
| Wilson Chandler (24)
| Nikola Jokić (15)
| Jameer Nelson (8)
| Philips Arena14,222
| 23–29
|- bgcolor=#bfb
| 53
| February 10
| @ New York
| 
| Nikola Jokić (40)
| Will Barton (10)
| Jameer Nelson (12)
| Madison Square Garden19,812
| 24–29
|- bgcolor=#fbb
| 54
| February 11
| @ Cleveland
| 
| Nikola Jokić (27)
| Nikola Jokić (13)
| Jameer Nelson (8)
| Quicken Loans Arena20,562
| 24–30
|- bgcolor=#bfb
| 55
| February 13
| Golden State
| 
| Juan Hernangómez (27)
| Nikola Jokić (21)
| Nikola Jokić (12)
| Pepsi Center19,941
| 25–30　
|- bgcolor=#fbb
| 56
| February 15
| Minnesota
| 
| Gary Harris (22)
| Nikola Jokić (15)
| Jameer Nelson (11)
| Pepsi Center13,924
| 25–31
|- align="center"
|colspan="9" bgcolor="#bbcaff"|All-Star Break
|- bgcolor=#fbb
| 57
| February 23
| @ Sacramento
| 
| Gary Harris (23)
| Nikola Jokić (10)
| Jameer Nelson (6)
| Golden 1 Center17,608
| 25–32
|- bgcolor=#bfb
| 58
| February 24
| Brooklyn
| 
| Gary Harris (25)
| Mason Plumlee (12)
| Mason Plumlee (8)
| Pepsi Center17,143
| 26–32
|- bgcolor=#fbb
| 59
| February 26
| Memphis
| 
| Danilo Gallinari (24)
| Nikola Jokić (11)
| Jokić, Chandler (6)
| Pepsi Center18,024
| 26–33
|- bgcolor=#bfb
| 60
| February 28
| @ Chicago
| 
| Danilo Gallinari (22)
| Nikola Jokić (16)
| Nikola Jokić (10)
| United Center21,015
| 27–33

|- bgcolor=#bfb
| 61
| March 1
| @ Milwaukee
| 
| Danilo Gallinari (22)
| Nikola Jokić (14)
| Nikola Jokić (10)
| BMO Harris Bradley Center13,214
| 28–33
|- bgcolor=#fbb
| 62
| March 4
| Charlotte
| 
| Nikola Jokić (31)
| Nikola Jokić (14)
| Jameer Nelson (5)
| Pepsi Center14,708
| 28–34
|- bgcolor=#bfb
| 63
| March 6
| Sacramento
| 
| Wilson Chandler (36)
| Chandler, Plumlee (12)
| Jameer Nelson (6)
| Pepsi Center11,614
| 29–34
|- bgcolor=#fbb
| 64
| March 8
| Washington
| 
| Gary Harris (26)
| Mason Plumlee (10)
| Jameer Nelson (6)
| Pepsi Center12,323
| 29–35
|- bgcolor=#bfb
| 65
| March 10
| Boston
| 
| Wilson Chandler (23)
| Nikola Jokić (10)
| Nikola Jokić (7)
| Pepsi Center17,147
| 30–35
|- bgcolor=#bfb
| 66
| March 11
| @ Sacramento
| 
| Gary Harris (24)
| Nikola Jokić (14)
| Mason Plumlee (8)
| Golden 1 Center17,608
| 31–35
|- bgcolor=#bfb
| 67
| March 13
| L.A. Lakers
| 
| Barton, Murray (22)
| Mason Plumlee (10)
| Gary Harris (7)
| Pepsi Center17,344
| 32–35
|- bgcolor=#bfb
| 68
| March 16
| L.A. Clippers
| 
| Will Barton (35)
| Nikola Jokić (14)
| Nikola Jokić (11)
| Pepsi Center14,179
| 33–35
|- bgcolor=#fbb
| 69
| March 18
| Houston
| 
| Gary Harris (17)
| Mason Plumlee (9)
| Jameer Nelson (11)
| Pepsi Center17,512
| 33–36
|- bgcolor=#fbb
| 70
| March 20
| @ Houston
| 
| Gary Harris (28)
| Nikola Jokić (13)
| Nikola Jokić (8)
| Toyota Center16,080
| 33–37
|- bgcolor=#bfb
| 71
| March 22
| Cleveland
| 
| Gary Harris (21)
| Nikola Jokić (10)
| Jameer Nelson (9)
| Pepsi Center19,718
| 34–37
|- bgcolor=#bfb
| 72
| March 24
| @ Indiana
| 
| Nikola Jokić (30)
| Nikola Jokić (17)
| Jameer Nelson (6)
| Bankers Life Fieldhouse17,923
| 35–37
|- bgcolor=#fbb
| 73
| March 26
| New Orleans
| 
| Mason Plumlee (16)
| Nikola Jokić (13)
| Jameer Nelson (5)
| Pepsi Center19,850
| 35–38
|- bgcolor=#fbb
| 74
| March 28
| @ Portland
| 
| Jameer Nelson (23)
| Wilson Chandler (9)
| Nikola Jokić (8)
| Moda Center20,003
| 35–39
|- bgcolor=#fbb
| 75
| March 31
| @ Charlotte
| 
| Nikola Jokić (26)
| Faried, Jokić (13)
| Nikola Jokić (10)
| Time Warner Cable Arena18,353
| 35–40

|- bgcolor=#bfb
| 76
| April 2
| @ Miami
| 
| Danilo Gallinari (29)
| Nikola Jokić (10)
| Emmanuel Mudiay (9)
| American Airlines Arena19,600
| 36–40
|- bgcolor=#bfb
| 77
| April 4
| @ New Orleans
| 
| Danilo Gallinari (28)
| Nikola Jokić (12)
| Emmanuel Mudiay (7)
| Smoothie King Center16,050
| 37–40
|- bgcolor=#fbb
| 78
| April 5
| @ Houston
| 
| Danilo Gallinari (23)
| Nikola Jokić (19)
| Nikola Jokić (9)
| Toyota Center18,055
| 37–41
|- bgcolor=#bfb
| 79
| April 7
| New Orleans
| 
| Jamal Murray (30)
| Nikola Jokić (12)
| Gary Harris (9)
| Pepsi Center16,348
| 38–41
|- bgcolor=#fbb
| 80
| April 9
| Oklahoma City
| 
| Danilo Gallinari (34)
| Chandler, Gallinari (10)
| Harris, Murray (9)
| Pepsi Center19,718
| 38–42
|- bgcolor=#bfb
| 81
| April 11
| @ Dallas
| 
| Gary Harris (20)
| Mason Plumlee (9)
| Jamal Murray (10)
| American Airlines Center20,333
| 39–42
|- bgcolor=#bfb
| 82
| April 12
| @ Oklahoma City
| 
| Nikola Jokić (29)
| Nikola Jokić (16)
| Nikola Jokić (8)
| Chesapeake Energy Arena18,203
| 40–42

Player statistics

Regular season

|- align="center" bgcolor=""
| 
| 41 || 7 || 15.6 || .442 || .453 || .864 || 2.7 || 1.0 || .5 || .5 || 6.4
|- align="center" bgcolor=""
| 
| 60 || 19 || 28.4 || .443 || .370 || .753 || 4.3 || 3.4 || .8 || .5 || 13.7
|- align="center" bgcolor=""
| 
| 22 || 1 || 7.5 || .452 || .321 || .800 || .8 || .5 || .3 || .00 || 3.8
|- align="center" bgcolor=""
| 
| 71 || 33 || 30.9 || .461 || .337 || .727 || 6.5 || 2.0 || .7 || .4 || 15.7
|- align="center" bgcolor=""
| 
| 61 || 34 || 21.2 || .548 || .000 || .693 || 7.6 || .9 || .7 || .7 || 9.6
|- align="center" bgcolor=""
| 
| 63 || style=|63 || style=|33.9 || .447 || .389 || .902 || 5.2 || 2.1 || .6 || .2 || style=|18.2
|- align="center" bgcolor=""
| 
| 13 || 0 || 6.8 || .214 || .000 || .556 || 1.2 || .5 || .4 || .1 || .8
|- align="center" bgcolor=""
| 
| 57 || 56 || 31.3 || .502 || .420 || .776 || 3.1 || 2.9 || style=|1.2 || .1 || 14.9
|- align="center" bgcolor=""
| 
| 62 || 9 || 13.6 || .451 || .407 || .750 || 3.0 || .5 || .5 || .2 || 4.9
|- align="center" bgcolor=""
| 
| 6 || 0 || 1.8 || .667 || .000 || .000 || .3 || .2 || .00 || .3 || .7
|- align="center" bgcolor=""
| 
| 73 || 59 || 27.9 || .578 || .324 || .825 || style=|9.8 || 4.9 || .8 || .8 || 16.7
|- align="center" bgcolor=""
| 
| 20 || 0 || 7.6 || .391 || .400 || style=|1.000 || 2.0 || 1.1 || .1 || .00 || 1.4
|- align="center" bgcolor=""
| 
| 55 || 41 || 25.6 || .377 || .315 || .784 || 3.2 || 3.9 || .7 || .2 || 11.0
|- align="center" bgcolor=""
| 
| style=|82 || 10 || 21.5 || .404 || .334 || .883 || 2.6 || 2.1 || .6 || .3 || 9.9
|- align="center" bgcolor=""
| 
| 75 || 39 || 27.3 || .444 || .388 || .714 || 2.6 || style=|5.1 || .7 || .1 || 9.2
|- align="center" bgcolor=""
| 
| 45 || 29 || 17.9 || .507 || .000 || .496 || 5.8 || 1.3 || .6 || .8 || 8.0
|- align="center" bgcolor=""
| 
| 7 || 0 || 6.6 || .467 || style=|.667 || style=|1.000 || 1.6 || .3 || .00 || .1 || 2.9
|- align="center" bgcolor=""
| 
| 27 || 10 || 23.4 || .547 || .000 || .618 || 6.4 || 2.6 || .7 || style=|1.1 || 9.1
|- align="center" bgcolor=""
| 
| 2 || 0 || 3.5 || style=|1.000 || .000 || .500 || 1.0 || 1.0 || .5 || .00 || 1.5
|}

 Statistics with the Denver Nuggets

Transactions

Trades

Contracts

Re-signed

Additions

Subtractions

Notes

References

Denver Nuggets seasons
Denver Nuggets
Denver Nuggets
Denver Nuggets